A lobby is a room in a building used for entry from the outside. Sometimes referred to as a foyer, reception area or an entrance hall, it is often a large room or complex of rooms (in a theatre, opera house, concert hall, showroom, cinema, etc.) adjacent to the auditorium. It may be a repose area for spectators, especially used before performance and during intermissions, but also as a place of celebrations or festivities after performance. In other buildings, such as office buildings or condominiums, lobbies can function as gathering spaces between the entrance and elevators to other floors.

Since the mid-1980s, there has been a growing trend to think of lobbies as more than just ways to get from the door to the elevator but instead as social spaces and places of commerce. Some research has even been done to develop scales to measure lobby atmosphere to improve hotel lobby design. Many office buildings, hotels and skyscrapers go to great lengths to decorate their lobbies to create the right impression and convey an image.

Etymology
The word "lobby" comes from Medieval Latin lobia, laubia or lobium.

Gallery

See also
 Atrium (architecture)
 Genkan
 Vestibule (architecture)

References

Parts of a theatre
Rooms

ar:بهو